"Think of Me" is a 1966 single by Buck Owens.  The single reached number one on the country charts and stayed at the top for six weeks.  "Think of Me" spent a total of twenty weeks on the country charts. "Think of Me" also made the Hot 100.

Chart performance

References
 

1966 singles
Buck Owens songs
Songs written by Don Rich
Song recordings produced by Ken Nelson (American record producer)
Capitol Records singles
1966 songs